McClellan Township is one of sixteen townships in Jefferson County, Illinois, USA.  As of the 2010 census, its population was 1,255 and it contained 534 housing units.

Geography
The township is centered at 38°15'N 88°59'W (38.258,-89.986). It is traversed north–south by Interstate Route 57, from it to the east by Interstate 64 and from I-57 to the southwest by State Route 148.

Cities, towns, villages
 Mount Vernon (southwest edge)
 Waltonville (northeast quarter)

Unincorporated towns
 Marcoe at 
(This list is based on USGS data and may include former settlements.)

Adjacent townships
 Shiloh Township (north)
 Dodds Township (east)
 Elk Prairie Township (south)
 Bald Hill Township (southwest)
 Blissville Township (west)
 Casner Township (northwest)

Cemeteries
The township contains these four cemeteries: Black, Rightnower, South Hickory Hill and Wolf Prairie.

Churches
The township contains several churches including:
 South Hickory Hill Christian Church
 West Long Prairie Christian Church
 Marcoe Church
 Antioch Missionary Baptist Church

Major highways
  Interstate 57
  Interstate 64
  Illinois Route 148

Demographics

School districts
 Waltonville Community Unit School District 1
 McClellan Community Consolidated School District 12
 Mt. Vernon Township High School
 Rend Lake Junior College

Political districts
 Illinois' 19th congressional district
 State House District 107
 State Senate District 54

References
 
 United States Census Bureau 2007 TIGER/Line Shapefiles
 United States National Atlas

External links
 City-Data.com
 Illinois State Archives

Townships in Jefferson County, Illinois
Mount Vernon, Illinois micropolitan area
Townships in Illinois